Fradique Bandeira Melo de Menezes (born March 21, 1942) is a São Toméan politician who was the third president of São Tomé and Príncipe from 2001 to 2011.

Early life
Menezes was born on the then Portuguese colony of São Tomé in 1942, the son of a Portuguese man and a local woman. He attended high school in Portugal. He then studied at the Instituto Superior de Psicologia Aplicada in Lisbon, Portugal and Free University of Brussels.

Career
Menezes is a businessman. He was Foreign Minister of São Tome and Príncipe from 1986 until 1987. He was elected President in July 2001 with about 55.2% of the vote, defeating Manuel Pinto da Costa, who received about 40%. Menezes took office on September 3, 2001. His eligibility as a candidate was questioned, since he also held Portuguese citizenship, but he renounced this and his candidacy was approved. On July 16, 2003, while he was away in Nigeria, there was a military coup d'etat led by Fernando Pereira, but Menezes was restored to power on July 23, 2003, following an agreement.

Menezes was re-elected on July 30, 2006, winning 60.58% of the vote and defeating Patrice Trovoada, son of former president Miguel Trovoada.

The discovery of a coup plot allegedly involving Christian Democratic Front leader Arlecio Costa was announced on February 12, 2009. Costa and more than 30 others were arrested. At a press conference on February 24, Menezes said that he was "touched" by the support of the security forces; he also said that he would be willing to leave office if he was "the reason that things are not working in this country".

Menezes received the World Peace Culture Award on July 13, 2002.

References

External links
 President Menezes' address to the 63rd session of the United Nations General Assembly, September 26, 2008

|-

|-

1942 births
Living people
Force for Change Democratic Movement – Liberal Party politicians
Foreign Ministers of São Tomé and Príncipe
Heads of state of São Tomé and Príncipe
People from São Tomé
São Tomé and Príncipe people of Portuguese descent
21st-century São Tomé and Príncipe politicians